is a regional airport serving Hachijōjima in the southern Izu Islands, Tokyo, Japan.

History

An air field was established on the island of Hachijōjima in 1926 by the Imperial Japanese Navy. In 1954, it was turned over to civilian control and managed by the local authorities on the island. Scheduled service between Hachijōjima and Haneda Airport in Tokyo by Fujita Airlines in 1955, and subsequently to Komaki Airport in Nagoya. On April 30, 1963, a DC-3-201E (Registration JA5039) operated by All Nippon Airways (ANA) crashed on landing. There were no injuries, but the aircraft was a total loss.

Later on August 17, 1963 Fujita Airlines DH-115 Heron (Registration JA6159) crashed shortly after takeoff into Hachijō-Fuji, the highest mountain on the island, killing all aboard (3 crew + 16 passengers). Following this fatal crash, Fujita Airlines was merged into All Nippon Airways.

From 2000, ANA subsidiary Air Nippon operated flights to Hachijōjima using a Boeing 737-400 colorfully painted with a dolphin design to promote tourism. The campaign proved successful, and the aircraft used on the route was changed to a 737-500, and then to an Airbus A320. Flights to Oshima Airport were discontinued from 2009.

Toho Air Service operates helicopter services from Hachijōjima Airport to Aogashima and Mikurajima. Only All Nippon Airways's Boeing 737 or Airbus A320 provide service to Haneda Airport every day.

Airlines and destinations

References

External links
 Airport Guide from ANA
 Official home page
 
 

Airports in Tokyo
Transport in the Greater Tokyo Area
Izu Islands